Auguste Engelbert Pierre Orts (7 April 1814 – 3 November 1880), was a Belgian lawyer and liberal politician.

Auguste Orts was a Lawyer, magistrate, professor at the Université Libre de Bruxelles and alderman of Brussels. He was President of the Belgian Chamber of Representatives from 19 July 1859 until 18 July 1860 and Minister of State.

See also
 Liberal Party
 Liberalism in Belgium

Sources
 Auguste Engelbert Pierre Orts
 Mesdach de ter Kiele, in : Biographie Nationale, Brussels, Académie Royale des Sciences, des Lettres et des Beaux Arts, 1866–1986, XVI, 1901, kol. 334–342.
 Vanderkindere, L., L'Université de Bruxelles 1834–1884, Brussel, 1884, p. 183-184.
 De Paepe, Jean-Luc, Raindorf-Gérard, Christiane (ed.), Le Parlement Belge 1831-1894. Données Biographiques, Brussels, Académie Royale de Belgique, 1996, p. 447-448.

1814 births
1880 deaths
Belgian Ministers of State
Politicians from Brussels
Presidents of the Chamber of Representatives (Belgium)